Nick Hinrichsen is an American politician currently serving in the Colorado Senate from Colorado's 3rd district. He was appointed to the seat after incumbent Democrat Leroy Garcia resigned to become special assistant to the Assistant Secretary of the Navy for Manpower and Reserve Affairs. In 2022, Hinrichsen won re-election. He was selected to replace Garcia and was sworn in on February 23, 2022.

He is married to Bri Buentello. In 2022, the couple were important supporters of Adam Frisch in his campaign for US House of Representatives.

References

Democratic Party Colorado state senators
21st-century American politicians
Living people
Year of birth missing (living people)
People from Pueblo, Colorado